Pestalozzi's Mountain is a 1989 East German–Swiss drama film directed by Peter von Gunten. The film is a biopic about the life of Swiss educator Johann Heinrich Pestalozzi. It was entered into the 39th Berlin International Film Festival.

Cast
 Gian Maria Volonté as Pestalozzi
 Rolf Hoppe as Zehender
 Heidi Züger as Mädi
 Christian Grashof as Zschokke
 Michael Gwisdek as Perrault
 Corinna Harfouch as Juliette Benoit
 Silvia Jost as Magd
 Angelica Ippolito as Anna
 Peter Wyssbrod as Hofstetter
 Käthe Reichel as Alte Köchin
 Isolde Barth as Rosalia
 Mathias Gnädinger as Büttel
 Roger Jendly as Kutscher
 Leandra Zimmermann as Kathrin

References

External links

1989 films
1989 drama films
1980s biographical drama films
East German films
1980s German-language films
Films directed by Peter von Gunten
Films set in the 1790s
Biographical films about educators
Swiss biographical drama films
German biographical drama films
Cultural depictions of Swiss men
1980s German films